Phillip Matthew Stockman (born 25 January 1980) is an English born Australian former pitcher in Major League Baseball.

Amateur career
Although Stockman was born in England, he grew up in Australia and is a graduate of Beenleigh State High School in Brisbane, Australia, and he has represented that country as a member of Australia's national baseball team. While with the team, Stockman won a silver medal at the 2004 Summer Olympics, and he was also a participant in the 2006 World Baseball Classic.

Professional career
Originally signed by the Arizona Diamondbacks organization, Stockman was a Texas League All-Star in 2003, while working as a starting pitcher for the El Paso Diablos. He signed with the Braves as a six-year minor league free agent in 2006, and earned a midseason promotion to the majors. His contract was purchased from the Richmond Braves on 14 June 2008 in place of RHP Chris Reitsma, who was placed on the 15-day disabled list. He made his debut the next day. On 16 May 2008 Stockman was called up to the major leagues and pitched 1 scoreless inning of relief against Oakland on 17 May, which included his first two career strikeouts (which were Mark Loretta and Josh Beckett.)

He was released on 15 March 2009 due to injuries.

Brisbane Bandits
In the inaugural 2010–11 Australian Baseball League season, Stockman played for the Brisbane Bandits, becoming the first former Major League player to play for them. He finished his Australian Baseball League career that season earning a 2.45 ERA in 10 games, with a miserly .067 batting average against him.

Stockman has been part of the team's coaching staff since the 2014–15 Australian Baseball League season.

References

External links

1980 births
Living people
Major League Baseball players from Australia
Major League Baseball players from the United Kingdom
Major League Baseball players from England
English baseball players
Atlanta Braves players
Baseball players at the 2004 Summer Olympics
Major League Baseball pitchers
Olympic baseball players of Australia
Olympic silver medalists for Australia
2006 World Baseball Classic players
English emigrants to Australia
Sportspeople from Oldham
Olympic medalists in baseball
Arizona League Diamondbacks players
Missoula Osprey players
Lancaster JetHawks players
Yakima Bears players
El Paso Diablos players
Tucson Sidewinders players
Tennessee Smokies players
Mississippi Braves players
Richmond Braves players
Rome Braves players
Gulf Coast Braves players
Brisbane Bandits players
Medalists at the 2004 Summer Olympics